"Hollow" is a power ballad by American heavy metal band Pantera from their 1992 album Vulgar Display of Power. A live medley of "Hollow" and another Pantera song, "Domination", is featured on Official Live: 101 Proof as "Dom/Hollow".

Lyrics
The lyrics are a reflection on a friend who has slipped into a comatose or vegetative state. Phil Anselmo says that the song was not about a specific person, but a series of losses he suffered.

Song structure
The song is the last on the album and starts off with a harmonized electric guitar phrasing (in 6/8), with an electric guitar with a chorus effect in the background. Phil Anselmo's voice is much softer in the beginning of this song, as opposed to the rest of the album. The vocals are very reminiscent of another hit ballad by Pantera, "Cemetery Gates". The song starts with a medium tempo and continues until the middle. Preceding a short solo by  Dimebag Darrell, there is a short breakdown and the song continues with more intense heavy riffing and drumming (in 4/4) and more aggressive raspy singing and growling from Anselmo.

Release and reception
The song was released in 1992 as the band's third single for Vulgar Display of Power. Although the song is one of Pantera's most well known songs, it failed to chart.

Track listing
 "Hollow" (single edit)
 "Hollow" (LP version)

Personnel 

 Phil Anselmo – vocals
 Dimebag Darrell – guitars
 Rex Brown – bass
 Vinnie Paul – drums

References

1990s ballads
1992 singles
1992 songs
Pantera songs
Song recordings produced by Terry Date
Songs written by Dimebag Darrell
Songs written by Vinnie Paul
Songs written by Phil Anselmo
Songs written by Rex Brown
Heavy metal ballads